The Avalon Morningside Park is a luxury apartment building constructed in 2007 on a piece of land that formerly constituted a portion of the cathedral close of the Cathedral of St. John the Divine in the Morningside Heights neighborhood of Manhattan, New York City. The building, a twenty-story glass tower, can be seen from Morningside Park nearby. The Cathedral initially retained ownership of the land, with AvalonBay Communities holding a 99-year lease.  In 2019, the land was sold, as well. The diocese explained that it was in desperate need of the $130 million generated by the project, which aroused considerable opposition in the surrounding community.

References

External  links
 

Apartment buildings in New York City
Residential buildings in Manhattan
Residential buildings completed in 2007
Morningside Heights, Manhattan
2007 establishments in New York City